Environmental compliance means conforming to environmental laws, regulations, standards and other requirements such as site permits to operate. In recent years, environmental concerns have led to a significant increase in the number and scope of compliance imperatives across all global regulatory environments.  Being closely related, environmental concerns and compliance activities are increasingly being aligned with corporate performance goals and being integrated to some extent to avoid conflicts, wasteful overlaps, and gaps.

Compliance with the above requirements and obligations, requires meeting certain conditions.  Typically, these include:
 Managing monitoring programmes or schedules, ensuring that the monitoring required in the permit has been done, at the correct locations, for the correct parameters, and at the correct frequency
 Pre-processing, performing calculations and validating the data for compliance with any alert or reporting levels
 Generating routine compliance reports for authorities.

The management of the above can be complex and time-consuming, leading to an increasing uptake of software systems designed to manage environmental compliance.  These are often referred to as 'Environmental Data Management Systems' (EDMS). Criteria must be considered when selecting environmental compliance software: proven capability, high performance, transparent, traceable data handling, a robust calculation engine, advanced factor handling, simple integration, automated workflows and QA, and flexible reporting and data extraction.

See also 
 MCERTS
 Environmental accounting
 Environment, health and safety
 Emission standard
 Environmental certification
 Environmental data
 Environmental monitoring

References 

Regulatory compliance
Environmental policy